The European mudminnow (Umbra krameri) is a species of fish in the Umbridae family found in Austria, Bosnia and Herzegovina, Bulgaria, Croatia, the Czech Republic, Hungary, Moldova, Romania, Serbia, Montenegro, Slovakia, Slovenia, and Ukraine.

References

Umbra (fish)
Freshwater fish of Europe
Fish described in 1792
Taxonomy articles created by Polbot